The following lists events that happened during 2013 in the Republic of Azerbaijan.

Incumbents
 President: Ilham Aliyev
 Prime Minister: Artur Rasizade
 Speaker: Ogtay Asadov

Events

January 

 January 23 - OIC Parliamentary Union recognizes Khojaly Massacre

February
 February 7: The Azerbaijan National Aerospace Agency launched its first satellite AzerSat 1 into orbit on 7 February 2013 from Guiana Space Centre in French Guiana at orbital positions 46° East.

April 

 World Economic Forum in Baku

May 

 May 7 - The opening ceremony of First South Caucasus Forum 
 May 29–1 June - 2nd World Forum on Intercultural Dialogue

June

 June 14 - The IV Congress of Azerbaijani Women 
June 26 - The Azerbaijani Armed Forces celebrated their 95th anniversary with a military parade in Baku.

September 

 September 18 - Guba Genocide memorial complex

References

 
2010s in Azerbaijan
Years of the 21st century in Azerbaijan
Azerbaijan
Azerbaijan
Azerbaijan